Vriner's Confectionery is a historic confectionery store located at 55 Main Street in Champaign, Illinois.

History

The building was constructed in 1890 as a clothing store; Vriner's opened in the building in 1898. One of five or six candy shops operating in Champaign at the turn of the century, Vriner's was the longest-lived. The shop was located next to a vaudeville theater and near Champaign's railroad station, and it became popular with patrons of both. The store also led to an influx of Greek immigrants to Champaign, as Vriner's promised jobs to many of the new immigrants.

The building was added to the National Register of Historic Places on May 9, 1983. The confectionery store closed in 1997; while the Vriner family still makes candy, they no longer have a permanent storefront. A country bar now occupies the building.

References

Buildings and structures in Champaign, Illinois
Commercial buildings completed in 1890
Commercial buildings on the National Register of Historic Places in Illinois
Confectionery companies of the United States
National Register of Historic Places in Champaign County, Illinois